Zbigniew Jaworowski (17 October 1927 – 12 November 2011) was a Polish physician, and alpinist.

Life
Zbigniew Jaworowski was chairman of the Scientific Council of the Central Laboratory for Radiological Protection in Warsaw and former chair of the United Nations Scientific Committee on the Effects of Atomic Radiation (1981–82). He was a principal investigator of three research projects of the U.S. Environmental Protection Agency and of four research projects of the International Atomic Energy Agency. He has held posts with the Centre d'Etude Nucleaires near Paris; the Biophysical Group of the Institute of Physics, University of Oslo; the Norwegian Polar Research Institute and the National Institute for Polar Research in Tokyo.

Climate change 
Jaworowski's works on ice cores were published in Jaworowski (1994, 1992) and in reports Jaworowski (1990, 1992). Jaworowski has suggested that the long-term CO2 record is an artifact caused by the structural changes of the ice with depth and by postcoring processes.

However, Jaworowski's views are ignored by the scientific community. Increases in CO2 and CH4 concentrations in the Vostok core are similar for the last two glacial-interglacial transitions, even though only the most recent transition is located in the brittle zone. Such evidence argues that the atmospheric trace-gas signal is not strongly affected by the presence of the brittle zone. Similarly Hans Oeschger states that "...Some of (Jaworowski's) statements are drastically wrong from the physical point of view".

Opinions 
Stephen Schneider said of him that "Jaworowski is perhaps even more contrarian than most, claiming that he can prove the climate is going to get colder through his work excavating glaciers on six different continents, which he says indicates what we should really be worrying about is 'The approaching new Ice Age...'." Jaworowski wrote The current sunspot cycle is weaker than the preceding cycles, and the next two cycles will be even weaker. Bashkirtsev and Mishnich (2003) expect that the minimum of the secular cycle of solar activity will occur between 2021 and 2026, which will result in the minimum global temperature of the surface air. The shift from warm to cool climate might have already started..

When approached to see if he would bet on future cooling, Jaworowski denied making any prediction, stating "I do not make my own detailed projections. In my paper I referred the reader to B&M paper, and that is all."

Jaworowski published several papers
in 21st Century Science and Technology, a non-refereed magazine published by Lyndon LaRouche.

Jaworowski has also written that the movement to remove lead from gasoline was based on a "stupid and fraudulent myth," and that lead levels in the human bloodstream are not significantly affected by the use of leaded gasoline.

Primary published articles
Jaworowski, Z., 1999, Radiation Risk and Ethics, Physics Today, 52(9), September 1999, pp. 24–29. link
Jaworowski, Z., Hoff, P., Hagen, J.O., et al., 1997, A highly radioactive Chernobyl deposit in a Scandinavian glacier, Journal of Environmental Radioactivity, 35 (1), 91-108.
Jaworowski, Z., 1994, Ancient atmosphere - validity of ice records,  Environmental Science and Pollution Research,  1(3): p. 161-171.
Jaworowski, Z., T.V. Segalstad, and N. Ono, 1992, Do glaciers tell a true atmospheric CO2 story?, The Science of the Total Environment, 114, p. 227-284.
Jaworowski, Z., M Bysiek, L Kownacka, 1981, Flow of metals into the global atmosphere, Geochimica et Cosmochimica Acta, vol. 45, Issue 11, pp. 2185–2199. abstract
Jaworowski, Z., 1968, Stable lead in fossil ice and bones,  Nature,  217,  152-153.

Other publications
Jaworowski, Z., 2007, CO2: The greatest scientific scandal of our time, EIR Science, pdf
 Jaworowski, Z., Winter 2003-2004,  Solar cycles, not CO2, determine climate, 21st Century Science and Technology, pdf
 Jaworowski, Z., 2002, The Future of UNSCEAR, Science, 297 (19),  p. 335 (letter)
 Jaworowski, Z., 1999,  Radiation Risk and Ethics, Physics Today,  52(9). article on-line
Jaworowski, Z. 1999, The Global Warming Foly, 21st Century Science and Technology, 7 (1), 31-41
Jaworowski, Z.,  1997, Another global warming fraud exposed. Ice core data show no carbon dioxide increase, 21st Century Science and Technology, pdf
Jaworowski, Z., 1996, Reliability of Ice Core Records for Climatic Projections, In The Global Warming Debate (London: European Science and Environment Forum), p. 95.
Jaworowski, Z., 1994, The Posthumous Papers of Leaded Gasoline., 21st century Science and Technology,  7, No. 1, pp. 34–41
Jaworowski, Z., Segalstad, T.V. and Hisdal, V., 1992a, Atmospheric CO2 and global warming: A critical review., Second revised edition, Meddelelser 119, Norsk Polarinstitutt, Oslo, p. 76.
Jaworowski, Z., Segalstad, T.V. and Hisdal, V., 1990. Atmospheric CO2 and global warming: a critical review., Rapportserie 59, p. 76, Norsk Polarinstitutt, Oslo.

See also
 The Great Global Warming Swindle - some of Jaworowski's arguments (astronomical causes, water vapor effect) are similar to the one in the movie.

References

External links
Paul Arnold, BBC, June 14, 2000.

Polish public health doctors
1927 births
2011 deaths